Maria Briscoe Croker (April 24, 1875 – May 6, 1962) was an American poet and Maryland's first Poet laureate. Croker was born at Charlotte Hall, Maryland in St. Mary's County. She attended St. Mary's Seminary (now St. Mary's College of Maryland), then Maryland State Normal School (now Towson University). Maryland Governor J. Millard Tawes appointed Croker Poet laureate in 1959. In 1895 she married Edward Joseph Croker at Charlotte Hall Academy where her father Edward Briscoe taught literature. One of Mrs. Croker's ancestors, John Briscoe, came to Maryland with the settlers on the Ark and the Dove. She has published three volumes of poetry and her poems are in roughly 50 anthologies.

References

External links 
 Print book: Vision and verity, poems, Baltimore, The Norman Remington Company, 1926. WorldCat.
 Print book: Tales and traditions of old Saint Mary's, Reistertown, Md. : Whitmore Pub., 1934. WorldCat.
 Print book: Land of the Singing Rivers; and other poems. WorldCat.

1875 births
1962 deaths
American women poets
19th-century American poets
20th-century American poets
20th-century American women writers
19th-century American women writers